Tobias Holmen Johansen (born 29 August 1990) is a retired Norwegian professional footballer who last played as a goalkeeper for Norwegian club Kongsvinger. He joined the club from Manchester City in 2010, where he played together with his younger brother Eirik. Johansen has represented Norway at youth international level.

Early life
Johansen was born in Tønsberg and grew up in Nøtterøy where he played for Teie IF during his youth, before he became a goalkeeper-reserve in the 2. divisjon club FK Tønsberg. Johansen's younger brother Eirik, who also plays as a goalkeeper, was invited for a trial with Manchester City during the 2007 fall, but due to a fracture in his foot he could not train. The family however travelled to England and arranged for Tobias to have a trial instead, even though he was too old to join the academy. Tobias impressed at the trial, and City offered him a contract. He lived with a host family in the beginning of his spell in Manchester, but after Eirik joined the academy in August 2008 their mother and two younger brothers moved to Manchester as well.

Club career

Manchester City
Johansen never played for Manchester City's first team, but was playing regularly for the reserve team and was occasionally considered as City's third-choice goalkeeper, and was in the match squad for six matches. While loaned out to Kongsvinger, Manchester City announced on 7 June 2010 that the club had released Martin Petrov, Sylvinho, Benjani, Jack Redshaw Karl Moore and Johansen from their contracts. Johansen claimed later the same month in an interview with the local newspaper Tønsbergs Blad, that he was promised a new contract, but after Mark Hughes departed the club, this did not happen.

Kongsvinger
Johansen was loaned out to Kongsvinger in the spring of 2010, as a replacement for Kongsvinger's second-choice goalkeeper Olav Dalen who was injured, and Johansen stated that he was looking forward to train with the experienced goalkeeper Thomas Myhre. Johansen played Kongsvinger's first-round match of the 2010 Norwegian Football Cup and made his debut in Tippeligaen against Start on 16 May 2010. The loan-deal was originally lasting till 30 June, but after he was released from City he signed a 3-year professional contract with Kongsvinger on 12 June 2010, with the Director of Sport, Morten Kristiansen, stating that young talented goalkeeper are rare in Norway, and Johansen is our goalkeeper for the future. He finished the season as third-choice goalkeeper, but after Dalen punctured his lung when Myhre was already injured, Johansen played the last two matches of the season.

Johansen were competing with Kim Deinoff for the goalkeeper-spot, and played 16 of 30 matches in the 2011 Norwegian First Division. Deinoff however became the first-choice in 2012, and Johansen got trouble with his back in May 2012 and was injured for the rest of the season. In January 2013, Johansen was hoping to be ready to play when the season started in April and was looking forward to again challenge the first-choice goalkeeper Deinoff.

International career
Johansen has represented Norway at youth international level, and played two matches for the under-16 team in 2006 before he played four matches for the under-19 team in 2009.

Career statistics

References

1990 births
Living people
People from Nøtterøy
Norwegian footballers
FK Tønsberg players
Manchester City F.C. players
Kongsvinger IL Toppfotball players
Eliteserien players
Norwegian First Division players
Norwegian expatriate footballers
Expatriate footballers in England
Norwegian expatriate sportspeople in England
Association football goalkeepers
Sportspeople from Tønsberg
Sportspeople from Vestfold og Telemark